The following list of waterfalls of British Columbia include all waterfalls of superlative significance.

Tallest waterfalls

By overall height
, there are 36 confirmed waterfalls with an overall height of at least .

By tallest single drop
, there are 26 confirmed waterfalls have a single unbroken drop with a height of at least .

Waterfalls by average flow rate
, there are 10 confirmed waterfalls with an average flow rate or discharge of at least .

Other noteworthy waterfalls

See also
List of waterfalls of Canada

References

External links

British Columbia

Waterfalls
Waterfalls